Jean Baptiste Charbonnier (23 April 1764 – 22 October 1859) was a French organist and composer.

Life 
Born in Châlons-sur-Marne, Charbonnier was successively organist in Châlons, at the Churches of Saint-Nicaise, Notre-Dame en Vaux, Saint-Alpin,  and finally of the Saint-Étienne cathedral.

He died in his native city of Châlons on 22 October 1859 at the age of 95.

Works 
He leaves an abundant body of work for the organ: varied Christmas, imitative works, storms, battles, harmonizations.

Bibliography 
Louis Grignon, Notice sur les œuvres musicales de M. J.-B. Charbonnier ancien organiste à Châlons-sur-Marne, Châlons-sur-Marne, 1878.
Sylvain Mikus, Vie et œuvre de Jean-Baptiste Charbonnier (1764-1859), Champagne généalogie, 1990.
Sylvain Mikus, Les organistes de la cathédrale de Châlons-en-Champagne au fil du temps, Le Petit Catalaunien illustré, spring 2009.

See also 
 French organ school
 Noël varié

External links 
 Bibliothèques municipales de Châlons Facsimile of the book by Louis Grignon, with scores of organ music.

People from Châlons-en-Champagne
French classical organists
French male organists
1764 births
1859 deaths
French classical composers
French male classical composers
Male classical organists